Miranda is the central town of Miranda Municipality, Carabobo.

Geography of Carabobo